Dennis Joseph Sullivan (born March 17, 1945) is an American prelate of the Roman Catholic Church. He served as vicar general and auxiliary bishop of the Archdiocese of New York in New York City until he replaced Bishop Joseph Anthony Galante as bishop of the Diocese of Camden in New Jersey in 2013. He lives in Woodbury, New Jersey.

Biography

Early life 
Dennis Sullivan was born on March 17, 1945, in the Bronx, New York, to John and Hanorah (née Hayes) Sullivan. One of four children, he has two brothers, Jack and Charlie, and one sister, Catherine. Dennis Sullivan attended Mount St. Michael Academy in the Bronx before entering Iona College in New Rochelle, New York.  He left Iona in his sophomore year to study for the priesthood at St. Joseph's Seminary in Yonkers, New York. Sullivan earned a Bachelor's degree and a Master of Divinity degree from St. Joseph's.

Priesthood 
Sullivan was ordained to the priesthood for the Archdiocese of New York by Cardinal Terence Cooke on May 29, 1971, and was then sent to the Dominican Republic to learn Spanish. He spent three months in the Dominican Republic, where he "learned to speak Spanish very fast because nobody spoke English."

After returning to New York City, Sullivan served as curate at St. Elizabeth's Parish in Washington Heights for five years. He also served as curate at SS Philip and James Parish in the Bronx (1976–1981) and at Ascension Parish in New York City (1981–1982). Sullivan was named pastor of St. Teresa's Parish on the Lower East Side of Manhattan in 1981, where he gained a degree of fluency in Chinese. In 1999, he was made a monsignor by the Vatican. Then in 2004, he became pastor of SS John and Paul Parish in Larchmont.

Sullivan was also a member of the Lower East Side Catholic Area Conference, the Archdiocesan Priests' Council, and the Archdiocesan Review Board for sexual abuse cases.

Auxiliary Bishop of New York 
On June 28, 2004, Sullivan was appointed as an auxiliary bishop of the Archdiocese of New York and titular bishop of Enera by Pope John Paul II. He received his episcopal consecration on September 21, 2004, from Cardinal Edward Egan, with Bishops Robert Brucato and Patrick Sheridan serving as co-consecrators. Sullivan selected as his episcopal motto: "In the Breaking of the Bread".

As an auxiliary bishop, Sullivan served as the vicar general for the archdiocese. He celebrated the funeral mass of the writer Reverend Richard Neuhaus in January 2009. Within the United States Conference of Catholic Bishops, Sullivan is a member of the Subcommittee on Asian and Pacific Island Affairs, and sat on the Catholic Campaign for Human Development Committee from 2005 to 2008.

Bishop of Camden
On January 8, 2013, Pope Benedict XVI appointed Sullivan as bishop of the Diocese of Camden.He was installed on February 12, 2013.

See also

 Catholic Church hierarchy
 Catholic Church in the United States
 Historical list of the Catholic bishops of the United States
 List of Catholic bishops of the United States
 Lists of patriarchs, archbishops, and bishops

References

External links
Roman Catholic Diocese of Camden Official Site

Episcopal succession

1938 births
Living people
Clergy from New York City
21st-century American Roman Catholic titular bishops
Iona University alumni
People from the Bronx
People from Woodbury, New Jersey
Saint Joseph's Seminary (Dunwoodie) alumni
Catholics from New York (state)
Catholics from New Jersey